Samuel Dale (1772 – ), known as the "Daniel Boone of Alabama", was an American frontiersman, trader, miller, hunter, scout, courier, soldier, spy, army officer, and politician, who fought under General Andrew Jackson, in the Creek War, later, becoming a brigadier general in the U.S. Army, and an advocate for Alabama statehood.

Samuel Dale was born in 1772, in Rockbridge County, Virginia to Scotch-Irish parents from Pennsylvania. As a boy, both he and his parents moved, many times, with westward border expansion, most notably in 1775 and 1783. With the death of his parents in December 1792, he was responsible for the welfare of eight younger children. From 1793–96 he served as a United States Government scout. He abandoned work as a trader between Savannah, Georgia and the border settlements and as a mill owner-operator to guide immigrants into Mississippi, over Native American lands.

Dale was present, in 1811, when Tecumseh enlisted local Alabama Native Americans to fight against Americans, during his campaign to establish a pan-Indian confederacy. Dale was involved in, many of, these confrontations, particularly in 1814, when he served as a courier bringing documents to Andrew Jackson in New Orleans, from Georgia in just eight days.

<blockquote>"General Dale, as a scout, a pilot to the emigrants who blazed the first path through the Creek Nation, from Georgia to Tombigby, with arms in there hands, and subsequently, as a spy among the Spaniards, at Pensacola, and as a partisan officer, during the most sanguinary epochs of the late war(1813 First Creek War - Red Stick War), present at every butchery, remarkable for "hair-breadth 'scapes," for caution and coolness in desperate emergencies, for exhibitions of gigantic personal strength and great moral courage, his story is studded over with spirit-stirring incidents, unsurpassed by any thing in legend or history.  His celebrated 'canoe fight,' where, in the Alabama river, he, with Smith and Jeremiah Austill, fought nine warriors, with clubbed rifles, killed them all, and rowed to shore, would be thought fabulous, if it had not been witnessed by many soldiers, standing upon the banks, who could render them no assistance.  Some years before, he was attacked by two warriors, who shouted their war-whoop, as he was kneeling down to drink, and rushed upon him with their tomahawks.  He knifed them both, and, though bleeding from five wounds, he retraced their trail nine miles, crept stealthily to their camp, brained three sleeping warriors and cut the thongs of a female prisoner, who lay by their side.  While in this act, however, a fourth sprang upon him, from behind a log.  Taken at such a disadvantage, and exhausted by the loss of blood, he sank under the serpent-grasp of the savage, who, with a yell of triumph, drew his knife, and, in a few moments, would have closed the contest.  At that instant, however, the woman drove a tomahawk deep into the head of the Indian, and thus preserved the life of her deliverer."</blockquote> – From "History of Alabama, and incidentally of Georgia and Mississippi, from the earliest period, Volume II" by Albert James Pickett, 1851

 Creek War 
Intercepting and raiding a Creek Supply train

On July 27, 1813. Spain, who was an ally of the British, supplied Creek Indian chief Peter McQueen with provisions, supplies, and gunpowder to resist American expansion. But only enough as to not openly antagonize the United States of America. Peter McQueen and 300 of his Indian Warriors were traveling back to their tribal village with their supply train. American militiamen under militia Colonel James Caller and militia Captain Dixon Bailey headed out to raid the Creek supply train. The American militia were joined by Samuel Dale and his fellow American militiamen numbering a total of at least 180 militiamen altogether. When the militia reached the location of the supply train, the Creek Indians were making camp and let down their guard. Colonel James Caller and his militia quietly dismounted and cautiously approached the Indian camp.
Then the American militia launched a surprise attack. The Indians were taken completely by surprise. The militia charged in while firing their weapons and the panicked Indians fired back to little effect running off. After the Indians fled, many of the militia let down their guard and immediately started looting the supply train without setting proper security. While most of the militia were distracted and too busy to loot, the Indians regrouped and launched a surprise counter-attack at the militia. At least 80 of the militia including Captains Samuel Dale, Dixon Bailey, and Smoot faced the Indians and bravely fought them. After 3 hours of fighting, the American militia retreated to safety. Even though the Creek Indians won tactically driving off the militia raiders, the militia were able to successfully carry off many of the pack-horses and their loads of supplies in their withdrawal back to American lines. The Creek Indians had 10-12 killed and 8-9 wounded. While the American militia had only 2 killed and 15 wounded.”A Conquering Spirit: Fort Mims and the Redstick War of 1813–1814" by Gregory A. Waselkov pages.304-305.

Ambushing Creeks in Canoe Fight

This ambush by Samuel Dale and his fellow militiamen on British allied-Creek Indians occurred on November 12, 1813. Samuel Dale took charge of Fort Glass, a small stockade about a quarter of a mile from Fort Madison. Dale had at least 50 American partisans under his command. During the day sentinels were posted around the fort. At night, Samuel Dale illuminated the approaches, for a circuit of one hundred yards, by a device of his own. Two poles, fifty feet long were firmly planted on each side of the fort; a long lever, upon the plan of a sell sweep, worked upon each of these poles; to each lever was attached a bar of iron about ten feet long, and to these bars the Americans fastened, with trace-chain, huge parts of light-wood. The illumination from such an elevation was brilliant, and no covert attack could be made upon Samuel’s position. As a precaution against the Indian torch, Samuel had his block-houses and their roofs well plastered with clay. The Americans displayed themselves in arms frequently, the women wearing hats and the garments of their husbands, to impress upon the spies that the Americans knew were lurking around an exaggerated notion of American strength. Sometime later, Samuel’s scouts brought news of 80 or a hundred Indians camped on the eastside of Alabama, near what is now called Dale’s Ferry. Samuel Dale took 60 militiamen to attack the enemy if practicable. Crossing the river in two canoes, which Samuel Dale previously concealed, the Americans spent the night in the canebrake. At daylight, he manned each canoe with five picked men, and directed them to move cautiously up the river, while the rest of the American militia followed the trail which ran along the bank. When the Americans reached Bailey’s, whose cabins were on the east, and his corn-crib and field on the west bank, the Americans discovered two Indian canoes, laden with corn, paddling up stream. Samuel Dale ordered fellow militiaman Jerry Austill to lay his canoes under the bluff and conceal his men from the Indians until Samuel could get ahead of them. Samuel and his militiamen pushed on at a lively rate, George Foster and Samuel being a hundred yards in advance of the other. At an abrupt turn of the path they suddenly encountered five warriors. Samuel shot one down while militiamen Foster shot the next, and the rest broke into the cane-break. Afterwards, Samuel put 30 of his militiamen on the east bank while he kept the western bank with 20 militiamen. Soon, he saw 11 Indian warriors in boats. So Dale with 7 militiamen chased the Indians. After intense fighting, Samuel and his men killed all 11 Indian warriors. Samuel Dale and his men got their canoes, crossed them all over, and withdrew safely back to their fort.

Raiding Creek Villages
Samuel Dale rode with Major Cassel’s American horse-mounted militiamen to raid and destroy Creek villages. The militia rode near an upriver and destroyed an enemy Red Stick village at the mouth of Pintlala Creek. The American militia raiders set camp on December 25, 1813. Samuel Dale and his militia then rode on raiding and destroying other Creek enemy villages and farms in the neighborhood. The raiding militia force then rode back to Fort Deposit. Then Samuel Dale and his fellow militia raiders withdrew back to Fort Clairborne.

 Further Career 
Dale was elected to the first Alabama General Assembly in 1817, serving until 1829. As a legislator and distinguished veteran brigadier general, he and four other men received the visiting Marquis de Lafayette of France into Alabama. A decade later, he was accidentally injured and was not able to carry out the illegal (against a ruling of the U.S. Supreme Court) forced relocation of the local Choctaw-speaking Indians the complete distance from Alabama and Mississippi to their assigned territories in Oklahoma. General Dale was the first elected member of the Mississippi House of Representatives to come from Lauderdale County, Mississippi. He next visited Washington, D.C., to request compensation for the supplies that were bought for his troops. He was disappointed when he received no recognition from the Federal Government.

 Death 
Dale died on May 24, 1841, in Lauderdale County, Mississippi, and was buried there near Daleville, which was named in his honor.  Dale County, Alabama is also named for him. Fort Dale, which Dale led the construction of, was also named in his honor.

Gallery

References

 Johnson, Allen & Malone, Dumas, eds. Dictionary of American Biography''. New York: Charles Scribner's Sons, 1959.

External links

Dale County, Alabama
1772 births
1841 deaths
American militia generals
American militiamen in the War of 1812
Members of the Mississippi House of Representatives
Members of the Alabama Legislature
People from Lauderdale County, Mississippi
People from Rockbridge County, Virginia
American people of Scotch-Irish descent
People of the Creek War